The Golden God is a 1917 American film written by Robert Hage and Frederick Rath. The film stars Charles Hutchison, Alma Hanlon, Florence Short, and Mary Doyle. It premiered on June 19, 1917.

References

External links

1917 films
American silent feature films
American black-and-white films
1917 drama films
Silent American drama films
1910s American films